Ralph Peters (born April 19, 1952) is a retired United States Army lieutenant colonel and author.

In addition to his non-fiction books, he has published eight novels under the pen name Owen Parry of which Honor's Kingdom received the Hammett Prize.  Three of his novels published as Ralph Peters received the W.Y. Boyd Literary Award for Excellence in Military Fiction.

Early life and education
Peters is of German Lutheran descent on his father's side, and Welsh Methodist on his mother's. He was born in Pottsville, Pennsylvania and grew up in nearby Schuylkill Haven. His father was a coal miner and businessman. His wife, Katherine McIntire Peters, is the Deputy Editor of Government Executive Media Group, a division of Atlantic Media.

Career

Military
Peters enlisted in the U.S. Army in 1976 after graduating from Pennsylvania State University.

Peters' first assignment was in Germany. After returning from Germany, he attended Officer Candidate School and received a commission in 1980. Subsequently, he served with 1st Battalion, 46th Infantry Regiment, then part of the 1st Armored Division.

Peters spent ten years in Germany working in military intelligence. He later became a Foreign Area Officer, specializing in the Soviet Union. He attended the Command and General Staff College. His last assignment was to the Office of the Deputy Chief of Staff for Intelligence. He retired in 1998 as a lieutenant colonel, concluding a total of 22 years of military service.

Writing
Peters's first novel was Bravo Romeo, a spy thriller set in West Germany, and was published in 1981. Since then, his novels progressed from futuristic scenarios involving the Soviet Army to contemporary terrorism and failed state issues. His characters are often presented as military mavericks who have the knowledge and courage to tackle problems others cannot or will not. His novel, The War After Armageddon, was released in 2009. In 2008, he published the non-fiction Looking for Trouble: Adventures in a Broken World. He is a regular contributor to the military history magazine, Armchair General Magazine, and he also serves on its Advisory Board.

He has also written historical war novels.  His novels about the American Civil War have been well received and recognized with the Hammett Prize and the W.Y. Boyd Literary Award for Excellence in Military Fiction.

He has published numerous essays on strategy in military journals such as Parameters, Military Review, and Armed Forces Journal, reports for the United States Marine Corps (see Center for Emerging Threats and Opportunities), formerly wrote a regular opinion column for the New York Post, and has written essays and columns for USA Today, The Wall Street Journal, The Washington Post, Newsweek, The Weekly Standard, The Washington Monthly and Army magazine. Peters is a member of the Board of Contributors for USA Today'''s Forum Page, part of the newspaper's Opinion section.

Views

Iraq War
Peters strongly supported the 2003 invasion of Iraq and the ensuing Iraq War. In July 2017, Fox News host Tucker Carlson told Peters: "I would hate to go back and read your columns assuring America that taking out Saddam Hussein will make the region calmer, more peaceful, and America safer when, in fact, it has done exactly the opposite, and it has empowered Russia and Iran, the two countries you say you fear most."

Afghanistan
In February 2009, Peters called for U.S. troops to be pulled out of Afghanistan, writing, "we've mired ourselves by attempting to modernize a society that doesn't want to be – and cannot be – transformed." He continued, "We needed to smash our enemies and leave. Had it proved necessary, we could have returned later for another punitive mission. Instead, we fell into the great American fallacy of believing ourselves responsible for helping those who've harmed us."

Bowe Bergdahl
Peters expressed sympathy for POW Sergeant Bowe Bergdahl's family, but speculated (Fox News, July 19, 2009) that Bergdahl might be "an apparent deserter ... if he walked away from his post and his buddies in wartime – I don't care how hard it sounds – as far as I'm concerned the Taliban can save us a lot of legal hassles and legal bills." He characterized Bergdahl's description (in the Taliban produced video) of U.S. military behavior in Afghanistan as collaboration with the enemy, even if coerced. Peters hoped Bergdahl would be reunited with his family, but argued that the US media had glorified one captured soldier who Peters claimed had shamed his unit and lied, while ignoring genuine heroes and casualties (The O'Reilly Factor, July 21).

Donald Rumsfeld
In 2011, Peters criticized former Defense Secretary Donald Rumsfeld, saying: "I am allergic to Rumsfeld. We did a great thing in Iraq, but we did it very badly. He is an extremely talented man but he has the tragic flaw of hubris. His arrogance is unbearable. My friends in uniform just hate him."

Obama foreign policy
During Stuart Varney's Fox Business Network show on December 7, 2015, Peters referred to President Barack Obama as a "total pussy", leading Fox News to suspend him for two weeks.

Russia
In July 2017, Peters said that Russian President Vladimir Putin "is comparable" to Adolf Hitler. "He hates America. He wants to hurt us. ... Russia is evil. Russia is our enemy."

Israel
Peters praised President Donald Trump for his decision to recognize Jerusalem as Israel's capital.

Fox News
In March 2018, Peters publicly quit his role as an expert commentator on Fox News. In his goodbye letter to his colleagues, he wrote:
Four decades ago, I took an oath as a newly commissioned officer. I swore to "support and defend the Constitution," and that oath did not expire when I took off my uniform. Today, I feel that Fox News is assaulting our constitutional order and the rule of law, while fostering corrosive and unjustified paranoia among viewers. Over my decade with Fox, I long was proud of the association. Now I am ashamed.In the same letter, he also called the Trump administration "ethically ruinous" and accused Fox News of "harming our system of government for profit", calling the network a "propaganda machine" for the Trump administration.  On Anderson Cooper 360°,  Peters likened Trump's behavior to sedition.

Awards
In 2013, Peters was named as the recipient of the W.Y. Boyd Literary Award for Excellence in Military Fiction from the American Library Association for his novel Cain at Gettysburg.  He received the award again in 2014 for Hell or Richmond and in 2016 for Valley of the Shadow and in 2020 for Darkness at Chancellorsville.

In 2002, he received the Hammett Prize from the International Association of Crime Writers, North American Branch (IACW/NA) for Honor's Kingdom.

Bibliography

Novels
 As Ralph Peters
 Bravo Romeo – 1981 
 Red Army – 1989 
 The War in 2020 – 1991 
 Flames of Heaven: A Novel of the End of the Soviet Union – 1994 
 The Perfect Soldier – 1995 
 The Devil's Garden – 1998 
 Twilight of Heroes – 1999 
 Traitor – 1999 
 The War After Armageddon – 2009 
 The Officers' Club – 2011 
 Cain at Gettysburg – 2012 
 Hell or Richmond – 2013 
 Valley of the Shadow – 2015 
 The Damned of Petersburg – 2016 
 Judgment at Appomattox – 2017 
 Darkness at Chancellorsville: A Novel of Stonewall Jackson's Triumph and Tragedy – 2019 
 As Owen Parry
 Faded Coat of Blue – 1999 ; 
 Shadows of Glory – 2000 ; 
 Call Each River Jordan – 2001 ; 
 Honor's Kingdom – 2002 ; 
 The Bold Sons of Erin – 2003 ; 
 Our Simple Gifts: Civil War Christmas Tales – 2004 ; 
 Strike the Harp!: American Christmas Stories – 2004 ; 
 The Rebels of Babylon: a Novel – 2005 ; 
 As Robert Paston
 The Hour of the Innocents – 2014 

Nonfiction
 Fighting for the Future: Will America Triumph? – 1999 
 Beyond Terror: Strategy in a Changing World – 2002 
 Beyond Baghdad: Postmodern War and Peace – 2003 
 New Glory: Expanding America's Global Supremacy – 2005 
 Never Quit the Fight – 2006 
 Wars of Blood and Faith: The Conflicts That Will Shape the 21st Century – 2007 
 Looking For Trouble: Adventures in a Broken World – 2008 
 Endless War – 2010 
 Lines of Fire: A Renegade Writes on Strategy, Intelligence, and Security – 2011 

References

Sources

External links

 Interview on New Glory at the Pritzker Military Museum & Library on September 21, 2005
 Interview on Wars of Blood and Faith'' at the Pritzker Military Museum & Library on November 29, 2007
 Constant Conflict 
 
 In Depth interview with Peters, August 3, 2008

1952 births
Living people
American people of Welsh descent
American people of German descent
American military writers
American historical novelists
People from Pottsville, Pennsylvania
Techno-thriller writers
United States Army officers
Pennsylvania State University alumni
United States Army Command and General Staff College alumni
Novelists from Pennsylvania
20th-century American novelists
21st-century American novelists
American male novelists
20th-century American male writers
21st-century American male writers
People from Schuylkill Haven, Pennsylvania
20th-century American non-fiction writers
21st-century American non-fiction writers
American male non-fiction writers
Military personnel from Pennsylvania